The New Rebellion is a 1996 bestselling Star Wars novel written by Kristine Kathryn Rusch and published by Bantam Spectra. The novel is set thirteen years after the Battle of Endor in the Star Wars expanded universe.

Plot
"Somewhere in the galaxy, millions suddenly perish—a disruption of the Force so shocking it is felt by Luke at his Jedi academy and by Leia on Coruscant. While Leia must deal with an assassination attempt, a rumored plot against the New Republic, and allegations that Han Solo is involved, Luke seeks out a former Jedi student who may hold the key to the mass destruction. But Brakiss is only the bait in a deadly trap set by a master of the dark side who is determined to rule as emperor. He's targeted Luke, Leia, and Leia's children to die. Then billions will follow, in a holocaust unequaled in galactic history."

Background
Mass murder has always rattled the Force. In Star Wars Episode IV: A New Hope, Obi-Wan Kenobi experiences the suffering of the deaths of millions from the destruction of Alderaan. In The New Rebellion, Luke Skywalker will experience the same emotion.

Thirteen years after the Battle of Endor, the New Republic has defeated most of the Galactic Empire and many ex-Imperial star systems have joined the ranks. Moreover, corruption has spread throughout the ranks, which a series of antagonists are waiting to capitalize on.

Summary
Kueller, a Dark Jedi, destroys millions with his powers. Luke Skywalker feels this genocide, and is afraid that the destruction will continue. Meanwhile, an assassination attempt is made on Princess Leia Organa, which is blamed on Han Solo. However, this is quickly discovered to be Kueller's doing.

Luke decides to seek the aid of Brakiss, a former student. However, Brakiss is in on Kueller's plan, and Luke joins the spiral of death that is to follow. Eventually, Luke Skywalker is led to Kueller, though a wake of destruction is left behind.

Dramatis personae 

The Dark Jedi Kueller sets in motion a plan to bring down the New Republic and the new generation of Jedi. First, he kills over a million innocent natives of the planet Pydyr and then sets off a bomb in the New Republic Senate Hall. 
As Jedi Master Luke Skywalker searches for the one behind all of this, Leia Organa Solo has her own problems arising from conflicts with newly elected former imperials in the senate, and the framing of her husband Han Solo by the smuggler Jarril, who is suspected to be responsible for the senate bombing. 
As Han Solo travels with Chewbacca to the Smuggler's Run to investigate the actions of Jarril in hopes of getting to the bottom of the Senate bombing, Luke Skywalker visits Brakiss on Telti looking for information, and Lando Calrissian heads to The Run after Han Solo who he fears is in danger. 
Meanwhile, Cole Fardreamer, with the aid of R2-D2 and C-3PO, discovers a plot to install all New Republic X-wing's with remote detonators. Leia becomes aware of this and concedes her position as Chief of State to Mon Mothma in order to rescue Luke from Kueller who has taken him prisoner on Almania. After Han rescues Lando, rather than Lando rescuing Han, from the clutches of the crime lord Nandreeson, and the two of them aide hundreds of smugglers after an accidental bombing of the run, Han also heads to Almania to rescue Luke. 
Han arrives at Almaniain the midst of a vicious battle between New Republic forces led by Wedge Antilles and Kueller's fleet. Han is also met by Talon Karrde and Mara Jade who have brought Ysalamiri to assist in the battle against Kueller. After a long gruelling battle against Kueller, in which Kueller has gained a tremendous amount of power fueled by Luke's own anger at himself for allowing Kueller to fall to the dark side, Luke is preparing himself for death at Kuellers hands as Han arrives on the scene with the Ysalamir, sapping both Luke and Kueller of their power, and in doing so allows Leia to finish Kueller with two lethal blaster shots. 
R2-D2 and C-3PO simultaneously thwart Kueller's plan to detonate millions of droids across the galaxy, enabling Leia to return to Coruscant and regain her post as Chief of State from Mon Mothma"

Reception
The New Rebellion was a New York Times' and a Wall Street Journal bestseller, like a majority of the Star Wars Bantam Spectra releases.

Notes
  Rusch biography. URL accessed on March 4, 2006.

References
Star Wars: The New Rebellion, 1st printing paperback, 1996. Kristine Kathryn Rusch,

Further reading

External links

1996 novels
1996 science fiction novels
New Rebellion
Bantam Spectra books